The Swedish Transport Administration is a government agency  in Sweden, controlled by the Riksdag and the Government of Sweden. It is responsible for long-term infrastructure planning for transport: road, rail, shipping and aviation. It owns, constructs, operates and maintains all state-owned roads and railways and operates many ferry services.

The agency is a member of the Nordic Road Association.

History
A special committee oversaw the effectiveness of the Swedish transport agencies during 2008 and 2009. A conclusion was reached that there would be significant gains compared with the then-present situation if a new agency responsible for long-term planning of the transport system for road, rail, maritime and air traffic was formed. Preparations started in the autumn of 2009, and the new authority began its work on 1 April 2010.

It took over all operations of the Swedish Road Administration and the Swedish Rail Administration, as well as parts of the Swedish Maritime Administration, Civil Aviation Administration and the Swedish Institute for Communications Analysis, except that some operations were transferred to new commercial companies. These companies do road and railway building and maintenance, airport operations etc.

See also
Swedish Transport Agency (Transportstyrelsen, a different Swedish government agency)
Riksdag
Swedish Transport Administration electric road program

References

External links
 

Swedish Transport Administration
Intermodal transport authorities
2010 establishments in Sweden
Government agencies established in 2010
 
Infrastructure in Sweden
 
 
Government railway authorities
Road transport organizations
Railway infrastructure managers